Southwestern Front may refer to:

Southwestern Front (Soviet Union), one of the Soviet Fronts in World War II
Southwestern Front (RSFSR), a front of the Red Army during the Russian Civil War (1918-1920).
Southwestern Front (Russian Empire), a Front of the Russian Imperial Army in World War I